Cupeyville School is a private, non-sectarian, co-educational college preparatory institution located in San Juan, Puerto Rico.

The school is accredited by the Middle States Association, the Department of Education of Puerto Rico, and C.A.D.I.E.  It is the only accredited school in Puerto Rico in hands of a Puerto Rican family.

Academic programs
Classes are divided into three programs: Regular, Bridges (for students needing more attention), and Advanced (Honor).
 English
 Spanish
 Math (Arithmetic, Pre-Algebra, Algebra I, Algebra II, Geometry, Pre-Calculus, AP Calculus)
 Science (Elementary, Life, Earth, Physics, Biology, Chemistry, AP classes)
 History (Puerto Rican, Latin American, World History, U.S. History, American History)
 Physical Education
 Home Economics
 Art
 Mosaic
 Music
 Writing
 Dance
 Health
 Computer
 College Board Preparation
 Counseling

Clubs

Elementary school
 Art
 Audio Visual
 Chess
 Chimes
 Choir boys
 Choir girls
 Drama
 Falcon News
 Flute
 Mosaic
 Origami
 Readers
 Recycle

Middle & High School
 Dance
 English Club
 Environmental
 Falcon Chronicles
 Forensics
 Info
 Italian
 Math
 Model United Nations (U.N.)
 Music (choir, bells & chimes)
 Pandora
 Reading
 Science
 Dean's Student Security
 Sharing Hearts
 Spanish - Middle School Only (Club de Español)
 Spanish Club - High School Only (Círculo de Español)
 Spanish Oratory (Oratoria)
 Photography

Memberships & Affiliations
 College Board
 National Association of College Admissions Counselors
 Caribbean Counselors Association
 Asociación Puertorriqueña de Orientación
 National Association of Secondary School Principals
 National Association of Elementary School Principals
 Association for Supervision and Curriculum Development
 National Council of Teachers of Mathematics
 TESOL
 International Reading Association
 National Come Libro Society
 National Junior Honor Society
 Association of Private Education of Puerto Rico
 P.R. High School Athletic Alliance

References

External links
 Cupeyville web site

Educational institutions established in 1963
Elementary schools in Puerto Rico
High schools in Puerto Rico
1963 establishments in Puerto Rico